Torgeir Bryn (pronounced ; born 19 August 1964) is a Norwegian former professional basketball player. A 6'9" (2.06 m) and 250 lb (113 kg) center born in Oslo, Bryn is notable for being the only Norwegian who has played in the NBA thus far.

Club career

United States
In the U.S., Bryn attended MiraCosta Community College (Oceanside, California) and then Southwest Texas State University (San Marcos, Texas), where he played NCAA college basketball. At MiraCosta College Bryn played for Clete Adelman, older brother of NBA coach Rick Adelman. He enjoyed a very brief NBA career during the 1989–90 season; his stint for the Los Angeles Clippers limited to playing ten minutes over three matches in which he scored four points. He also played for several CBA clubs and a USBL club.  In the CBA, Bryn played for the Tulsa Fast Breakers, San Jose Jammers, Quad City Thunder, Fort Wayne Fury and Omaha Racers.  He averaged 7.1 points in 71 games between 1989 and 1993.

Europe
Bryn also played professionally for a number of European clubs, namely SLBenfica in Portugal and Zalgiris, Kaunas in Lithuania.

Norway
His youth club in Norway was Ammerud Basket. He also had spells for the Oslo Kings (Vålerenga Kings) and Harstad Vikings.

Bryn made a comeback for Ammerud Basket at the age of 43, before the 2007–08 BLNO season. He played together with his son, Martin Bryn.

NBA career statistics

Regular season 

|-
| style="text-align:left;"| 1989-90
| style="text-align:left;"| L. A. Clippers
| 3 || 0 || 3.3 || .000 || .000 || .667 || 0.7 || 0.0 || .7 || 0.3 || 1.3

International career
He is the most capped player for the Norway national basketball team, with 111 matches.

References

External links
NBA.com historical playerfile
Year-by-Year career at basketpedya.com
Torgeir Bryn NBA statistics at basketball-reference.com

1964 births
Living people
ALM Évreux Basket players
Aris B.C. players
BC Žalgiris players
CB Breogán players
CB Estudiantes players
Centers (basketball)
Élan Béarnais players
Fort Wayne Fury players
Gent Hawks players
Greek Basket League players
Junior college men's basketball players in the United States
Liga ACB players
Los Angeles Clippers players
Norwegian expatriate basketball people in Belgium
Norwegian expatriate basketball people in France
Norwegian expatriate basketball people in Greece
Norwegian expatriate basketball people in Portugal
Norwegian expatriate basketball people in Spain
Norwegian expatriate basketball people in the United States
Norwegian men's basketball players
Omaha Racers players
Power forwards (basketball)
Quad City Thunder players
S.L. Benfica basketball players
San Jose Jammers players
Sportspeople from Oslo
Texas State Bobcats men's basketball players
Tulsa Fast Breakers players
Undrafted National Basketball Association players